Złotoria may refer to the following places:
Złotoria, Kuyavian-Pomeranian Voivodeship (north-central Poland)
Złotoria, Gmina Choroszcz in Podlaskie Voivodeship (north-east Poland)
Złotoria, Gmina Czarna Białostocka in Podlaskie Voivodeship (north-east Poland)

See also
Złotoryja, Lower Silesian Voivodeship. Poland